Robert Harry Bernard Christmas (22 March 1924 – 20 January 2000) was a Canadian rower. He competed in the men's eight event at the 1948 Summer Olympics.

References

1924 births
2000 deaths
Canadian male rowers
Olympic rowers of Canada
Rowers at the 1948 Summer Olympics
Place of birth missing